was a Japanese daimyō of the Sengoku period. He was the eldest son of Bessho Yasuharu.

In 1578 Oda Nobunaga called on his retainers to attack the Mōri clan. Nagaharu almost decided to allied with the Oda clan, but after hearing that the low-born general Hashiba Hideyoshi whom he did not respect as the leader, he was revolted, instead allying himself with Hatano Hideharu of Tanba province.

Nagaharu took a stand in Miki Castle, this led to Nagaharu being besieged by Hideyoshi's troops on the orders of Nobunaga,  starting the Siege of Miki.  The siege did not go well for Hideyoshi, and with a revolt by Araki Murashige and the help of the Mōri clan Nagaharu successfully repelled the Oda force. 

But in 1579, Hideyoshi returned and this time instead of launching a direct assault, he launched multiple sieges against smaller castles like Kamiyoshi Castle and Sigata Castle to cut off the support from Mōri. This led to a rapid depletion of food, and in 1580, with no hope of another reinforcement from Mōri clan, Nagaharu committed seppuku in exchange for the lives of the troops in Miki Castle.

Related Pages
Miki Castle

References

 Japanese Wiki article on Bessho (20 Sept. 2007)

Further reading
Matsubayashi Yasuaki 松林靖明 (1996). Bessho ki: kenkyū to shiryō 别所記: 研究と資料. Osaka: Izumi Shoin 和泉書院.

1558 births
1580 deaths
16th-century Japanese people
Daimyo
People of Muromachi-period Japan
Samurai
Suicides by seppuku